Kentish Town is an area of northwest London, England in the London Borough of Camden, immediately north of Camden Town. Less than four miles north of central London, Kentish Town has good transport connections and is situated close to the open spaces of Hampstead Heath.

Toponymy
The name of Kentish Town is probably derived from Ken-ditch or Caen-ditch, meaning the "bed of a waterway" and is otherwise unrelated to the English county of Kent. In researching the meaning of Ken-ditch, it has also been noted that ken is the Celtic word for both "green" and "river", while ditch refers to the River Fleet, now a subterranean river. However, another theory is the name comes from its position near the Fleet; it has been suggested that Kentish Town, which lies in between two forks of the Fleet, takes its name from cant or cantle (from the Middle English meaning "corner").

History
Kentish Town was originally a small settlement on the River Fleet (the waterway is now one of London's underground rivers). It is first recorded during the reign of King John (1207) as kentisston. By 1456 Kentish Town was a thriving hamlet. In this period, a chapel of ease was built for its inhabitants.

The early 19th century brought modernisation, causing much of the area's rural qualities, the River Fleet and the 18th-century buildings to vanish, although pockets still remain, for example Little Green Street. Between the availability of public transport to it from London, and its urbanisation, it was a popular resort.

Large amounts of land were purchased to build the railway, which can still be seen today. Kentish Town was a prime site for development as the Kentish Town Road was a major route from London northwards. Karl Marx was a famous resident, living at 46 Grafton Terrace from 1856. Jenny Marx described this eight-room house in Kentish Town as "A truly princely dwelling, compared with the holes we used to live in" (March 11, 1861 letter by Jenny Marx, quoted in Rachel Holmes, "Eleanor Marx: A Life", Bloomsbury Books, London, 2014,P 10).

1877 saw the beginning of mission work in the area as it was then poor. The mission first held their services outside but as their funding increased they built a mission house, chapel, and vicarage. One mission house of the area was Lyndhurst Hall which remained in use before being taken over by the council. The Council wished it to sell it for residential use, and the hall was demolished in 2006.

During the 19th century and early 20th century the area of Kentish Town became the home of several piano and organ manufacturers, and was described by The Piano Journal in 1901 as "...that healthful suburb dear to the heart of the piano maker".

A network of streets in the East of Kentish Town has streets named after places or persons connected with Christ Church, Oxford viz: Oseney, Busby, Gaisford, Caversham, Islip, Wolsey, Frideswide, Peckwater & Hammond. All these streets lay behind the Oxford Arms. Some of the freehold of these streets is still in the name of Christ Church Oxford.

A network of streets in the north of Kentish Town was part of a large estate owned by St John's College, Cambridge. Lady Margaret Road is named after Lady Margaret Beaufort, foundress of St John's College. Burghley Road is named after Lord Burghley, Chancellor to Elizabeth I and benefactor of St John's. Similarly, College Lane, Evangelist Road and Lady Somerset Road are street names linked to the estate of St John's College.

In 1912 the Church of St Silas the Martyr (designed by architect Ernest Charles Shearman) was finally erected and consecrated, and by December of that year it became a parish in its own right. It can still be seen today along with the church of St Luke with St Paul and the Church of St Barnabas (handed over to the Greek Orthodox Church in 1957). The present Church of England parish church is St Benet and All Saints, Lupton Street.

In his poem Parliament Hill Fields, Sir John Betjeman refers to "the curious Anglo-Norman parish church of Kentish Town". This possibly refers to the former parish Church of St John Kentish Town.

Kentish Town Road contains one of London's many disused Tube stations. South Kentish Town tube station was closed in June 1924 after strike action at the Lots Road Power Station meant the lift could not be used. It never reopened as a station, although it was used as an air raid shelter during World War II. The distinctive building is now occupied underground by a massage shop and on ground level by a 'Cash Converters' pawn shop at the corner of Kentish Town Road and Castle Road.  There have been proposals to rebuild the station.

Kentish Town was to see further modernisation in the post-World War II period. However, the residential parts of Kentish Town, dating back to the mid-19th century have survived.

Political representation 
Kentish Town is part of the Holborn and St Pancras seat which is held by Labour Party MP and leader Keir Starmer as of September 2021. Kentish Town was an early base for the Social Democratic Party and in recent years the increasingly middle class population has returned large votes for the Green and Liberal Democrat parties. In May 2006 the Liberal Democrats won two of the three Council seats in Kentish Town, strengthening this hold by taking the final seat in a by-election in November of the same year. In the Council elections in May 2010, Labour regained all three Council seats.

In May 2022, the ward of Kentish Town North elected two Labour Councillors Sylvia McNamara and James Slater. Kentish Town South reelected Labour Councillors Georgia Gould, Meric Apac, and Jenny Headlam-Wells.

Demography
In the 2011 census, 53% of the population was White British and 15% were White Other.

Filming location 

In 2002 the comedy and drama film About a Boy was filmed in Lady Margaret Road, which is located at the top of Kentish Town, and Oseney Crescent. Many of the filming locations used in the 2006 film Venus, starring Peter O'Toole, Leslie Phillips, and Jodie Whittaker were in Kentish Town. In 1959 Lady Somerset Road and Oakford Road were used substantially for the filming of Sapphire, a film exploring racial tension in London, directed by Basil Dearden. The Assembly House pub was the location for the 1971 film Villain starring Richard Burton. The 1993 comedy Bad Behaviour, featuring Stephen Rea and Sinéad Cusack, was set in Kentish Town and includes scenes set in several local streets and the Owl Bookshop.

The 1947 Ealing Studios film It Always Rains on Sunday had scenes shot in Clarence Way during 1944 or 46 showing Holy Trinity Church with just the lower part of its spire still intact following the destruction of the upper section of the spire in WWII. The entire spire has since been removed leaving the church, effectively, with a tower. Kentish Town was also used as the location for the BBC comedy series Gimme Gimme Gimme with its main protagonists Tom and Linda living with their ex-prostitute landlord and upstairs neighbour Beryl at the fictional and suggestively named "69 Paradise Passage". In addition, the video of the Madness track "Baggy Trousers" was filmed at Islip Street School and the park in Kentish Town.

The Anglican Parish Church of St John Kentish Town, now known as "Christs Apostolic Church", was used by Only Fools and Horses as the backdrop (in external scenes) exterior of the Church where Damien was christened.

Plenty of exterior shots in the BBC tragicomedy Fleabag were filmed in Kentish Town, star/writer Phoebe Waller-Bridge being a resident.

Shops and businesses 
In 2005, a survey of Kentish Town by the local Green Party claimed that out of 87 shops on Kentish Town Road (locally known as Kentish Town High Street), 53 were still independently owned. The high street is a mixture of national retail chains and independent shops, including a long-standing bookshop, several delis and organic stores. Many 'World Food' shops have opened up on the street. However, since 2009 there has been a marked increase in independent shops being replaced with chain stores including Pret a Manger, Costa Coffee, Caffe Nero and Sainsbury's.

Kentish Town Health Centre 
An architectural design competition was launched by RIBA Competitions and Camden Primary Care Trust and James Wigg Practice to design a new integrated care centre in Kentish Town that would deliver a flagship building, new models of care, enhance integrated working and provide a model for future delivery of primary care throughout the country. Through this process Architects AHMM were selected and the building opened in 2008 and has since been credited with a number of awards including RIBA Award for Architecture 2009 and Building Magazine Public Building Project of the Year 2010.

Kentish Town Community Centre 
Kentish Town Community Centre is a community centre, created in 2004, to provide meeting spaces and activities for local residents of all ages.

Culture, bars and music 

Pub rock is usually traced back to the "Tally Ho" in Kentish Town, a former jazz pub, where Eggs over Easy started playing in May 1971, and were soon joined by Bees Make Honey, Brinsley Schwarz, Max Merritt and the Meteors, Ducks Deluxe and others. Other music pubs include the Bull and Gate which featured early performances by Blur, The Housemartins, Suede, PJ Harvey, and Coldplay.

The Assembly House is a Grade II listed pub at 292–294 Kentish Town Road.

In more recent years, the area has continued the trend for the resurgence of real ale pubs like the CAMRA award-winning Southampton Arms, the Pineapple, and Tapping the Admiral which was the CAMRA North London Pub of the Year in 2013. Many of these are stocked with keg and bottled beers from the Camden Town Brewery, located in the arches under Kentish Town West London Overground station.

Kentish Town is also home to The Forum (formerly known as the Town and Country club), during the 1950s a cinema, and now a live music venue.

Spring 2014 saw Kentish Town to get its first speak easy, 1920s style hidden bar, when Knowhere Special opened its doors next to Kentish Town station.

Torriano Avenue, dating back to 1848, is a Kentish Town street home to Pete Stanley, one of the country's best-known bluegrass banjo players; British actor Bill Nighy; and The Torriano Poets, where local poets have met for over 20 years and still hold weekly public poetry readings on Sunday evenings: its founder was John Rety. The street is also home to two pubs, one being an 1850s hostelry The Leighton, the other The Torriano, which was for many years an old-fashioned community off-licence. They take their names from the local landowners, Sir David Leighton and Joshua Torriano, who developed the land for housing in the mid 19th century.

One of London's most famous nudist public baths, Rio's, is in Kentish Town.

St Pancras public baths

The largest municipal building in Kentish Town is the St Pancras public baths, opened in 1903, designed by Thomas W. Aldwinckle. The large complex originally had separate first and second class men's baths and a women's baths, along with a public hall. Little of the interior remains intact. The baths were closed in January 2007 for refurbishment and re-opened at the end of July 2010.

Architecture and geography 

Kentish Town has a fairly large boundary, stretching from Camden Gardens to as a far north as the Highgate Road/Gordon House Road junction near Dartmouth Park. Kentish Town generally includes the areas to the west, around Queens Crescent and to the east around Torriano.

Notable residents 

 John William Salter, Victorian geologist and palaeontologist
 Akala, rapper
 Ben Aaronovitch, writer
 Charles Dance, actor
 Tobias Menzies, actor
 Gerry Badger, photographer
 Mike Barson, keyboardist of the British pop/ska band Madness
 Siân Berry, Green Party politician and 2008 Green Party candidate for London Mayor
 Archie Bland, journalist, writer and Deputy Editor of The Independent newspaper
 Phil Clifton, TV and radio presenter
 Tom Conti, actor
 Giles Coren, restaurant critic
 Joe Craig, author of the Jimmy Coates series
 Hunter Davies, writer
 Simon Day, comedian
 Noel Fielding, comedian
 William Harrison, popular tenor and actor
 Mr Hudson, singer 
 Margaret Forster, writer
 Ben Goldacre, medical doctor and journalist
 Eddy Grant, reggae and rock artist
 Patricia Hewitt, former Secretary of State for Health
 Tom Hiddleston, actor
 Leigh Hunt, 19th century journalist and poet
 Bert Jansch, folk musician
 Daniel Kaluuya, actor
 Roger Lloyd-Pack, actor
 Katharine Sarah Macquoid, writer
 Karl Marx, 19th century political philosopher 
 Scott Mills, radio DJ
 Peter Robert Henry Mond, – (28 February 1948– 28 August 2018) former Lord in Waiting, Parliamentary Under-Secretary of State and Minister of State
 Harry Mount, historian, barrister and journalist
 Mae Muller, singer and songwriter
 Henry Neele, poet
 Mohamed Nur, Mayor of Mogadishu
 George Orwell, writer
 Gareth Peirce, solicitor
 Lucy Porter, comedian
 Daniel Prenn (1904–1991), Russian-born German, Polish, and British world-top-10 tennis player
 James Canham Read (1855-1894) the "Southend Murderer"
 Jolyon Rubinstein, comedian
 Alan Rusbridger, editor of The Guardian newspaper
 Jon Snow, television journalist
 Keir Starmer, former Director of Public Prosecutions, since 2020 leader of the Labour Party
 Jim Sturgess, actor and musician
The Roots, band
 R. N. Taber, poet
 Gillian Tindall, writer and historian
 Roz Walker
 Astrid Zydower, sculptor
 Katherine Pierce, actress
 Phoebe Waller-Bridge, writer/actress
 Tim Key, comedian and poet

Transport
Kentish Town has a range of transport connections: a mainline railway station that is served by Thameslink along with an interchange to the London Underground; Underground stations, overground connection (at Kentish Town West and Camden Road stations) and multiple bus routes with the majority going into or around Central London.

Bus Routes
The following Bus Routes serve Kentish Town: 88 (24 hour), 134 (24 hour), 214 (24 hour), 393 and Night Bus Route N20.

Nearest stations 
 Kentish Town station
 Gospel Oak railway station
 Kentish Town West railway station
 Camden Road railway station
 Camden Town tube station
 Caledonian Road tube station

Neighbouring areas
 Camden Town and Chalk Farm to the south
 Barnsbury to the south-east
 Tufnell Park and Holloway to the east
 Dartmouth Park and Archway to the north-east
 Highgate to the north
 Hampstead and Belsize Park to the west

Footnotes

References
 
 

 
Areas of London
Districts of the London Borough of Camden
Places formerly in Middlesex
District centres of London